Kazancı is a Turkish place name and may refer to:

 Kazancı, a town in Ermenek district of Karaman Province, Turkey
 Kazanci, a village in the municipality of Gacko, Bosnia and Herzegovina
 Kazancı, Bismil
 Kazancı, Hınıs
 Kazancı, Ilgaz

Turkish toponyms